USS R-13 (SS-90) was an R-class coastal and harbor defense submarine of the United States Navy.

Construction and commissioning
R-13′s keel was laid down  by the Fore River Shipbuilding Company in Quincy, Massachusetts, on 27 March 1918. She was launched on 27 August 1919, sponsored by Miss Fanny B. Chandler, and commissioned on 17 October 1919.

Service history

1919–1941
Following shakedown in New England waters, R-13 briefly operated out of New London, Connecticut. In the spring of 1920 she conducted training patrols off Bermuda, then prepared for transfer to the Pacific. She departed the East Coast in mid-June; transited the Panama Canal in early July. Given hull classification symbol SS-90 at midmonth, she continued up the west coast to San Pedro, Los Angeles, whence she headed for Hawaii on 26 August.

R-13 arrived at Pearl Harbor on 6 September and for the next nine years assisted in the development of submarine warfare tactics. Ordered back to the Atlantic with the new decade, the submarine stood out from Pearl Harbor 12 December 1930 and on 9 February 1931 arrived back at New London. There, she served as a training ship until 1941. However, she was in Annapolis, Maryland, on 30 June 1932.

1941–1946
On 26 May 1941, R-13 headed south to her new homeport, Key West, Florida. Arriving at the end of the month, she returned to New London in July, but was back off southern Florida in August. During the fall she conducted operations in the Gulf of Mexico, then assumed training duties for the Sound School at Key West. Through World War II, she continued the work there and out of Port Everglades, Florida, and conducted patrols in the Yucatán Channel and the Florida Straits.

With the cessation of hostilities, R-13 decommissioned 14 September 1945, was struck from the Naval Vessel Register on 11 October 1945, and was sold 13 March 1946.

References

External links
 

R-13 (SS-90)
World War II submarines of the United States
Ships built in Quincy, Massachusetts
1919 ships